The Benjamin Hait House, also known as the Hoyt House, is a historic house at 92 Hoyclo Road in Stamford, Connecticut.  It is a -story wood-frame structure, five bays wide, with a large central chimney.  Built c. 1735, it is the oldest house in the High Ridge section of Stamford, and is a rare example of a New England farmhouse amidst a now-suburban area.  The house remained in the hands of the Hoyt family until 1960.  It has been restored.  It is located on what is now a quiet road, but which once was a segment of high-traffic High Ridge Road between Stamford and outlying areas, and a route to New York State.

The house was listed on the National Register of Historic Places in 1978.

See also
National Register of Historic Places listings in Stamford, Connecticut

References

Houses on the National Register of Historic Places in Connecticut
Houses completed in 1735
Houses in Stamford, Connecticut
National Register of Historic Places in Fairfield County, Connecticut